Elections to East Lothian Council were held on 1 May 2003, the same day as the other Scottish local government elections and the Scottish Parliament general election.

Election results

Ward results

Labour
Musselburgh West
Musselburgh South
Musselburgh North
Musselburgh Central
Musselburgh East
Wallyford/Whitecraig
Prestonpans West
Prestonpans East
Cockenzie and Port Seaton
Tranent West
Tranent/Macmerry
Tranent/Elphinestone
Ormiston/Pencaitland
Haddington Central
Haddington East/Athelstaneford
Dunbar/West Barns
Dunbar East

Conservative
Longniddry
Aberlady/Direleton/Gullane
East Linton/Gifford
North Berwick West

Lib Dem
Haddington West/Saltoun

SNP
North Berwick East

References

2003 Scottish local elections
2003